Robin John Peterson (born 4 August 1979) is a former South African cricketer who bowls left arm spin and is a capable batsman. He has played 14 Tests and over 70 ODIs for South Africa. He announced his retirement from all forms of cricket on 9 November 2016.

Domestic career
In December 2009, it was revealed that he had signed a contract to play for Derbyshire on a Kolpak contract.

He attended Alexander Road High School in Port Elizabeth and matriculated in 1997.

He was bought by the Mumbai Indians in the 2012 Indian Premier League players auction for $100,000.

International career
He holds the dubious accolade of being the bowler from whom Brian Lara scored a tally of 28 runs in a single Test match over, a world record at the time.

He was the last bowler to dismiss Ricky Ponting in Test cricket, having him caught at slip by Jacques Kallis after Ponting made just 8 runs in his final test innings.
He had also given 35 runs in a match in ODI against Thisara Perera.

ICC World Cup 2011
Robin Peterson's 4 for 12 versus Bangladesh is his best bowling performance in ODIs surpassing his 3 for 22 against England in Chennai. He also hit a quickfire 21  to make his team win against India. He finished the tournament as the highest South African wicket taker of the tournament with 15 wickets at 15.86 average.

References

External links
 
 

1979 births
Living people
Eastern Province cricketers
South Africa One Day International cricketers
South Africa Test cricketers
South African cricketers
South Africa Twenty20 International cricketers
Warriors cricketers
Cape Coloureds
Cricketers from Port Elizabeth
Cricketers at the 2003 Cricket World Cup
Cricketers at the 2007 Cricket World Cup
Cricketers at the 2011 Cricket World Cup
Mumbai Indians cricketers
Derbyshire cricketers
Surrey cricketers
Barbados Royals cricketers
Boland cricketers